Coal Pool is a housing estate in Walsall, West Midlands, England. Most of the homes in area were built by the local council during the 1930s, with a smaller development taking place in the late 1940s which marked the resumption of council house building in the borough after World War II.

During World War II, an air raid on a house in Beddows Road on 14 November 1940 resulted in a 19-year-old Blakenall Heath man being seriously injured; he died in Walsall Manor Hospital shortly afterwards. This was the only civilian fatality during the Second World War.

Community facilities and housing have been improved, and unlike the large scale demolition in other parts of Blakenall, relatively little demolition has taken place around Coal Pool, with the overwhelming majority of the properties being refurbished.

References

External links 
Coalpool Church

Areas of the West Midlands (county)
Walsall